Mutants is a French science-fiction horror film based on a screenplay from Louis-Paul Desanges and David Morlet It was directed by French filmmaker David Morlet and stars Hélène de Fougerolles, Dida Diafat and Francis Renaud.

Plot

A virus has transformed the vast majority of humanity into bloodthirsty, zombie creatures. Marco and Sonia are young couple fleeing the "mutants" and trying to fight their way to a military base. But when Marco himself becomes infected in an attack, the pregnant Sonia must fight the worst enemy – the man she loves.

Cast
 Hélène de Fougerolles as Sonia
 Francis Renaud as Marco
 Dida Diafat as Virgile
 Marie-Sohna Condé as Perez
 Nicolas Briançon as Franck
 Luz Mandon as Dany
 Driss Ramdi as Abel
 Grégory Givernaud as Paul
 Justine Bruneau de la Salle as young girl
 Jérémy Loth as mutant
 Sébastien Rouquette as mutant
 Frédéric Troussier as mutant
 Cyril Hipaux as mutant
 Nicolas Leprêtre as mutant
 Cécile Corsalan as mutant
 Emmanuel Lanzi as stuntman mutant
 Frédéric Alhinho as stuntman mutant
 Yves Girard as stuntman mutant
 Patrick Vo as stuntman mutant
 Marie Dang as stuntwoman mutant

Production
The film was shot in a bleak Picardy, scorched in snow and sluiced down in gray.

Release
Mutants premiered on 31 January 2009 as part of the Gérardmer Film Festival and participated in the Festival du Film Français au Japon on 13 March 2009. The United States distribution rights for the film were acquired by IFC Festival Direct and the company was due to release it on 10 February 2010 at Festival Direct on Demand. IFC Films set the US DVD and Blu-ray release for the 26 October 2010.

References

External links
 
 

2009 films
2000s French-language films
French science fiction horror films
French zombie films
2000s science fiction horror films
2000s monster movies
2000s French films